The Pancabrahma Upanishad (IAST: Pañca-brahma Upaniṣad) is a medieval era Sanskrit text and is one of the minor Upanishads of Hinduism. The text is classified as one of 14 Shaiva Upanishads, and one of the 32 Upanishads of the Krishna Yajurveda.

The Upanishad glorifies Shiva, with Vedanta nondualism terminology. The text is notable for its focus on Sadashiva, as Brahman, with his five faces corresponding to five Ishwaras, and for its recommendation of meditation on "So'ham" or "I am he, He am I" to achieve moksha, the union with Brahman.

History
The date or author of Pancabrahma Upanishad is unknown. Kramrisch states that this is a late text, but possibly one which was composed before the Vishnudharmottara Purana. She dates the latter to about 7th-century CE, contemporary with Ajanta Caves paintings.

Manuscripts of this text are also found titled as Panchabrahma Upanishad and Pancabrahmopanishad. In the Telugu language anthology of 108 Upanishads of the Muktika canon, narrated by Rama to Hanuman, it is listed as Pancabrahma Upanishad at number 93. This text is not a part of the 17th century compilation of 50 important Hindu Upanishads published by Mughal Era Dara Shikoh and of the 18th-century anthology of 52 Upanishads published by Colebrooke, nor is it found in the Bibliotheca Indica anthology by Narayana.

As an Upanishad, it is a part of the corpus of Vedanta literature collection that present the philosophical concepts of Hinduism.

Contents 
The text opens with sage Paippalāda asking Shiva, "what is that which came to exist first?" Shiva's reply is structured as the verses of Pancabrahma Upanishad.

The Pancabrahma Upanishad describes five forms of reality (Brahman) or Shiva that arose from highest reality – Sadyojata, Aghora, Vamadeva, Tatpurusha and Ishana. He is panchatmak, who conceals all five Brahmas, and to realize him is moksha. The Ishana, asserts the text, is the highest form of Brahman, unmanifested impeller, adorned with Om, and that all five Brahmas resolve into the supreme Nirguna (formless) Brahman. The supreme shines by its own light, beyond the five Brahmas, states this Pancabrahma text.

The Sadyojata represents earth and is associated with Kriya Sakti (power of action), asserts the text. The Aghora represents fire and drives the Iccha Sakti (power of will, desire) and Vamadeva represents water and impels the Jnana Sakti (power of knowledge). Tatpurusha represents air and is the power of life (breath, prana), while Ishana represents ether-space and the transcendental.

The Pancabrahma Upanishad, states Teun Goudriaan, focuses on these symbolism behind the five faces of Shiva and mystical equations about all except Ishana face. The Ishana face of Shiva is glorified with general epithets such as "superior to the pacified", as "Brahman", as "Supreme", as "lustre behind everything", and as "I myself am that Brahman", thus emphasizing his fundamental position in this text. The verse 23 of the manuscript asserts that one must meditate on Shiva within, with "So'ham" or "I am He, He am I" to achieve moksha, the union with Brahman. This outlook of this text corresponds to Advaita Vedanta position of Hindu philosophy, states Goudriaan.

This Upanishad, states Kramrisch, gives precedence to the "power of knowledge", in contrast with some Shaiva text such as Vatulasuddh-agama which emphasize "power of will". According to Kramrisch, this may be either doctrinal differences or possible errors in transmission of the manuscripts over the centuries, but the components of Shavism ontology are consistent across the texts, since the latter part of the 1st-millennium CE. The text, adds Kramrisch, asserts that "all this phenomenal world is the Parabrahman, Shiva, of the character of the fivefold Brahmans", and that everything in a being's inner and outer senses, that falls within or lies beyond, is Shiva of fivefold Brahman character.

The seeker realizes that aspect of five Brahman Shiva, in accord with the strength of his vision, his spiritual development, and it is Shiva who is in the heart of all beings, Shiva is Sat-Cit-Ananda, meaning existence, consciousness, and Bliss. Shiva is the liberator, asserts the text.

Reception
The pancabrahma concept found in this Upanishad is also found in the Śaivā Agamas, described in a similar way.

See also
Atharvashiras Upanishad
Kaivalya Upanishad
Narayana Upanishad
Tripura Upanishad

References

Bibliography

 

Upanishads